Riccardo Meli (born on 15 April 2001) is an Italian sprinter. He won the 2023 Italian indoor championships.

Career
Meli won a silver medal at the 2021 European Athletics U23 Championships in Tallinn.

He won a national championship at senior level during his career.

National titles
 Italian Athletics Indoor Championships
 400 metres: 2023

See also
 Italian national track relay team

References

External links
 

2001 births
Living people
Italian male sprinters
21st-century Italian people